Dactyloceras bramarbas is a moth in the family Brahmaeidae. It was described by Ferdinand Karsch in 1895. It is found in Cameroon.

References

Endemic fauna of Cameroon
Brahmaeidae
Moths described in 1895